Eric Ayuk Mbu (born February 17, 1997) is a Cameroonian footballer who plays as a winger.

Playing career

Youth
Ayuk played football while attending Lycée Bilingue de Yaoundé in his native Cameroon. In June 2012, he moved to Thailand as part of a program to introduce young Camaroonian players to a professional environment. Joining Buriram United of Thai Premier League and playing with its academy and reserve teams for the rest of 2012 and 2013.

Club

Surin City F.C.
Ayuk joined Surin City F.C., an affiliate of Buriram United at the start of its 2014 season in the 2014 Thai Division 2 League North Eastern Region, the third level of  Thai football league system. His first game with the team was a qualifying game in the 2014 Thai League Cup – a 2–1 loss to Loei City F.C. on January 29, 2014. He made his league debut on February 16, 2014, in a 2–2 tie against Sisaket United F.C. His first goal was the game-winning goal on February 22, 2014, in a 1–0 win over Mahasarakham United F.C. He also scored against Nong Khai F.C. in a 2–2 draw on March 29, 2014, and another in a 4–1 win over Chaiyaphum United on April 26, 2014.

Phichit F.C.
On June 19, 2014, Ayuk joined Phichit F.C. in the 2014 Thai Division 2 League Northern Region. He made his debut on June 28, 2014, in a 3–2 win over Chiangrai F.C. Ayuk's first goal came in a 5–0 win over Tak F.C. on July 6, 2014. On August 11, 2014, Ayuk scored against Uttaradit F.C. in his team's 4–1 victory. He added another goal on August 30, 2014, in his team's 4–3 defeat to Phrae United F.C. On September 7, 2014, Ayuk had his first 2-goal game in a 7–0 victory over Phayao F.C. He also scored in his team's lone goal in a 2–1 loss to Nakhon Sawan F.C. on September 13, 2014. Ayuk's performances helped Phichit F.C. gain promotion to the Thai Division 1 League for the 2015 season after placing in 2nd place in its 2014 Regional League Division 2 Champions League group. During the group games, he scored in Phichit F.C.'s 4–0 Champions Leaguevictory over Hua Hin City F.C. on November 22, 2014.

Philadelphia Union
Ayuk was signed by Philadelphia Union on March 3, 2015, after a successful pre-season trial. He was signed on a free transfer. He scored his first goal in a 4–1 loss to Columbus Crew on April 25, 2015.

Bethlehem Steel FC
Ayuk was loaned to Philadelphia Union USL affiliate, Bethlehem Steel FC for the 2016 season. Ayuk would be a regular starter for Steel FC and scored the first home goal in the team's history against FC Cincinnati. he would go on to make 17 appearances and scored three goals during the season.

Jönköpings Södra IF
On April 4, it was announced that Ayuk had joined Swedish first division outfit Jönköpings Södra IF on loan for the rest of the 2017 Allsvenskan Season. He would make 12 league appearances and one cup appearance in Sweden, scoring one goal.

Return to Philadelphia
In December 2017, it was announced that the Union exercised Ayuk's 2018 contract option.

Ankaraspor
On 28 August 2018, Ayuk was transferred TFF First League side Ankaraspor (named "Osmanlıspor" at the time of transfer) for no fee but included a 15-percent sell-on fee for the Union. Ayuk became a regular starter for Ankaraspor, starting 27 of 29 appearances and scoring 5 goals during his first season.

Career Statistics

Club

International
In April 2015, Ayuk was called into the Cameroon U-23 team for the 2015 CAF U-23 Championship but declined the call up to focus on his club career with the Philadelphia Union.
In May 2016, Ayuk was called up for the Cameroon U-20 team for their 2017 Africa U-20 Cup of Nations qualifier versus Zimbabwe.

References

External links
 
 

1997 births
Footballers from Yaoundé
Living people
Cameroonian footballers
Cameroon under-20 international footballers
Cameroon youth international footballers
Association football midfielders
Eric Ayuk
Eric Ayuk
Eric Ayuk
Philadelphia Union players
Penn FC players
Philadelphia Union II players
Jönköpings Södra IF players
Ankaraspor footballers
Pharco FC players
Major League Soccer players
USL Championship players
Allsvenskan players
TFF First League players
Egyptian Premier League players
Cameroonian expatriate footballers
Expatriate footballers in Thailand
Cameroonian expatriate sportspeople in Thailand
Expatriate soccer players in the United States
Cameroonian expatriate sportspeople in the United States
Expatriate footballers in Sweden
Cameroonian expatriate sportspeople in Sweden
Expatriate footballers in Turkey
Cameroonian expatriate sportspeople in Turkey
Expatriate footballers in Egypt
Cameroonian expatriate sportspeople in Egypt